Matina ya swan (Newar: मतिनाया स्वां) is the first Newar-language program in the Nepalese-government-owned Nepal Television 2 channel. The program was telecasted after the second Jana aandolan movement of Nepal. The program focusses on Newar culture and language.

Anchor
Pabitra Kasaa

See also
Nepal Bhasa
Nepal Bhasa movement

Newar-language mass media